Hawick is an unincorporated community in Roseville Township, Kandiyohi County, Minnesota, United States.

The community is located between New London and Paynesville along 
State Highway 23 (MN 23) at the junction with Kandiyohi County Road 2.  Hawick is located 41 miles west-southwest of the city of Saint Cloud.

History
Hawick was originally settled by immigrants from Norway during the mid-19th century through the early 20th century.

Hawick was first named Havig, according to author Martin Ulvestad, who wrote extensively about early Norwegian–American settlements in Minnesota circa 1907.

Conversely, according to Minnesota historian Warren Upham in the book Minnesota Place Names: a Geographical Encyclopedia" the name Hawick'' is believed to have come from local railroad superintendent R. Manvel, who named the community after Hawick, Scotland.

References

Unincorporated communities in Minnesota
Unincorporated communities in Kandiyohi County, Minnesota